Anarrachi (before 1927: Δέβρη - Devri) is a small village in the Mouriki municipal unit, northern Kozani regional unit, Greece. It is situated at an altitude of 709 meters above sea level. The postal code is 50005, and the telephone code is +30 24630. The population was 926 at the 2011 census.

References

Populated places in Kozani (regional unit)